The Hunter Mine caldera is a caldera complex in the North Volcanic Zone of the Abitibi greenstone belt in Ontario and Quebec, Canada. It is located at the eastern end of Lake Abitibi.

See also
Gemini caldera
List of volcanoes in Canada
Volcanism of Eastern Canada

References

Calderas of Ontario
Calderas of Quebec
Archean calderas
Subduction volcanoes
Landforms of Abitibi-Témiscamingue